Domingo Martínez de Irala is a district located in the Alto Paraná Department of Paraguay.

References 

Districts of Alto Paraná Department